Sabzan may refer to:
 Sabzan, Kerman
 Sabzan, Khuzestan
 Sabzan, Lorestan